Cretan Republic can refer to:

the republic declared in 1362 during the Sfakian rebellion;
the Cretan State (1898–1913).